Three ships of the Royal Navy have borne the name HMS Abdiel, after Abdiel, a seraph in Milton's Paradise Lost.

 was a  destroyer, built as HMS Ithuriel but renamed before being launched in 1915. She was sold for scrapping in 1936.
 was an  launched in 1940 and sunk by a mine in 1943.
 was an exercise minelayer and mine countermeasures support ship launched in 1967 and broken up in 1988.

Royal Navy ship names